Theta (uppercase: Θ or ; lowercase: θ or ;  thē̂ta ; Modern:  thī́ta ) is the eighth letter of the Greek alphabet, derived from the Phoenician letter Teth . In the system of Greek numerals, it has a value of 9.

Greek

In Ancient Greek, θ represented the aspirated voiceless dental plosive , but in Modern Greek it represents the voiceless dental fricative .

Forms
In its archaic form, θ was written as a cross within a circle (as in the Etruscan  or ), and later, as a line or point in circle ( or ).

(There is also ). For the purpose of writing Greek text, the two can be font variants of a single character, but  are also used as distinct symbols in technical and mathematical contexts. Extensive lists of examples follow below at Mathematics and Science.  is also common in biblical and theological usage e.g.  instead of πρόθεσις (means placing in public or laying out a corpse).

Latin

In Latin script used for the Gaulish language, theta inspired the tau gallicum. The phonetic value of the tau gallicum is thought to have been . Theta itself is used alongside Latin letters in Halkomelem, an indigenous North American language.

Cyrillic
The early Cyrillic letter fita (Ѳ, ѳ) developed from θ. This letter existed in the Russian alphabet until the 1918 Russian orthography reform.

International Phonetic Alphabet
In the International Phonetic Alphabet (IPA),  represents the voiceless dental fricative, as in thick or thin. It does not represent the consonant in the, which is the voiced dental fricative. A similar-looking symbol, [ɵ], which is described as a lowercase barred o, indicates in the IPA a close-mid central rounded vowel.

Mathematics and Science

Lower case
The lowercase letter θ is used as a symbol for:
A plane angle in geometry
An unknown variable in trigonometry
 The voiceless dental fricative, spelled θ
A special function of several complex variables
One of the Chebyshev functions in prime number theory
The potential temperature in meteorology
The score of a test taker in item response theory
Theta Type Replication: a type of bacterial DNA replication specific to circular chromosomes
Threshold value of an artificial neuron
A Bayer designation letter applied to a star in a constellation; usually the eighth star so labelled but not necessarily the eighth-brightest as viewed from Earth
The statistical parameter frequently used in writing the likelihood function
The Watterson estimator for the population mutation rate in population genetics
Indicates a minimum optimum integration level determined by the intersection of GG and LL schedules (The GG-LL schedules are tools used in analyzing the potential benefits of a country pegging their domestic currency to a foreign currency.)
The reserve ratio of banks in economic models
The ordinal collapsing function developed by Solomon Feferman
Heaviside step function
In pharmacology, the fraction of ligand bound to a macromolecule based on the Hill Equation

Upper case
The uppercase letter Θ is used as a symbol for:
Dimension of temperature, by SI standard (in italics)
Dimensionless temperature in transport phenomena
An asymptotically tight bound in the analysis of algorithms (big O notation)
A certain ordinal number in set theory
Pentaquarks, exotic baryons in particle physics
A brain signal frequency (beta, alpha, theta, delta) ranging from 4–8 Hz
One of the variables known as "Greeks" in finance, representing time decay of options or the change in the intrinsic value of an option divided by the number of days until the option expires
A variable indicating temperature difference in heat transfer
Measuring the angle of incident X-ray beam during XRD

Symbolism

In ancient times, Tau was used as a symbol for life or resurrection, whereas the eighth letter of the Greek alphabet, theta, was considered the symbol of death.

According to Porphyry of Tyros, the Egyptians used an X within a circle as a symbol of the soul; having a value of nine, it was used as a symbol for Ennead. Johannes Lydus says that the Egyptians used a symbol for Kosmos in the form of theta, with a fiery circle representing the world, and a snake spanning the middle representing Agathos Daimon (literally: good spirit).

The Egyptians also used the symbol of a point within a circle (the sun disc) to represent the sun, which might be a possible origin of its use as the Sun's astrological glyph. It is worthwhile to note that  (theta) has the same numerical value in isopsephy as Ηλιος (Helios): 318.

Abbreviation

In classical Athens, it was used as an abbreviation for the Greek θάνατος (Thanatos, "death") and as it vaguely resembles a human skull, theta was used as a warning symbol of death, in the same way, that skull and crossbones are used in modern times. It survives on potsherds used by Athenians when voting for the death penalty. Petrus de Dacia in a document from 1291 relates the idea that theta was used to brand criminals as empty ciphers, and the branding rod was affixed to the crossbar spanning the circle. For this reason, the use of the number 9 was sometimes avoided where the connotation was felt to be unlucky—the mint marks of some Late Imperial Roman coins famously have the sum ΔΕ or ΕΔ (delta and epsilon, that is 4 and 5) substituted as a euphemism where a Θ (9) would otherwise be expected.

Greek Life

The names of many American fraternities and sororities are named with Greek letters, including Theta.

Character encodings

 Greek Theta

 Coptic Thethe

 Cyrillic Fita

 Mathematical Theta

These characters are used only as mathematical symbols. Stylized Greek text should be encoded using normal Greek letters, with markup and formatting to indicate text style.

See also

 Ѳ, ѳ—Fita, a letter of the Ukrainian alphabet derived from the Greek theta
 ʘ—Bilabial click
 Dental fricatives
 Theta nigrum
 Latin theta

Notes and references

Notes

References 

 
Greek letters
Phonetic transcription symbols